Ab Darusheh-ye Chin (also Romanized as Āb Darūsheh-ye Chīn; also known as Āb Darūsheh, Āb Dorūshak, and Āb-e Dorūsheh) is a village in Chin Rural District, Ludab District, Boyer-Ahmad County, Kohgiluyeh and Boyer-Ahmad Province, Iran. At the 2006 census, its population was 107, in 17 families.

References 

Populated places in Boyer-Ahmad County